Pervomaysky is a rural locality (a settlement) in Krasnenskoye Rural Settlement, Paninsky District, Voronezh Oblast, Russia. The population was 230 as of 2010. There are 5 streets.

Geography 
Pervomaysky is located 10 km north of Panino (the district's administrative centre) by road. Perelyoshino is the nearest rural locality.

References 

Rural localities in Paninsky District